The Commander, Tactical Air Command was the most senior officer and head of the United States Air Force command called TAC.

List of Commanders of  Tactical Air Command

List of Vice Commanders of Tactical Air Command

References

See also 
List of United States Air Force four-star generals
List of commanders-in-chief of the Strategic Air Command
List of commanders of USAFE

United States Air Force lists
United States Air Force generals